Dublin, Wicklow and Wexford Railway (DW&WR) 11 built in 1896 was the predecessor to a total of twelve  locomotives to emerge from Grand Canal Street railway works between 1896 and 1910.  Eleven of twelve lasted through to the early 1950s, the only loss being due to the Civil war, and despite attempts to replace them remained they remained vital to the running of the South Dublin services suburban services to Bray throughout their lives.

Development
These locomotives were a development of the preceding s also by William Wakefield with the first two, No. 11 St Kevin in 1896 and No. 3 being new builds.  Four more subsequently constructed by rebuilding Wakefields 2-4-0T locomotives.  These were all later to form Great Southern Railways (GSR) class 428.  The succeeding locomotive engineer Cronin was to build 6 more similar locomotives which were allocated GSR class 434.  In practice during their lifetimes all twelve were subject to regular rebuilds with over 5 different types of boiler fitted.

They were an improvement over their forebears, with coal capacity up from 1.5 tons to 2.5 tons and water capacity nearly doubled to  meaning less frequent fill ups.

Service
The locomotives served the Dublin south suburban area until the rename of the DW&WR to the Dublin and South Eastern Railway (DSER) and on into  the Great Southern Railways grouping in 1925.  They were allocated the numbers 428—439 at this time, however No. 10, St. Senanus, was allocated a GSR number 429 but ultimately was declared a Civil War loss.  The remaining eleven engines were withdrawn and scrapped in the early 1950s with two surviving until 1957.

References

2-4-2T locomotives
5 ft 3 in gauge locomotives
Railway locomotives introduced in 1896
Scrapped locomotives
Steam locomotives of Ireland